Jan Dembowski may refer to:

Jan Dembowski (general) (1770–1823), Polish general and politician
Jan Dembowski (biologist) (1889–1963), Polish biologist and politician